Clean Juice is a faith based American restaurant franchise that primarily serves Organic smoothies, juices, acai bowls, wraps, salads, and sandwiches. 

Landon and Kat Eckles started Clean Juice® in 2016 as the first USDA-certified organic juice bar franchise, claiming to be the only franchise of its kind in 2016.     

There are over 170 locations either in development or in operation in 30 states in the United States. The company is headquartered in Charlotte, North Carolina.

History

Clean Juice was founded in 2014 by husband and wife, Landon and Kat Eckles. The first location in Huntersville, North Carolina in June 2015. In April 2016, another location opened in South Charlotte with a third location opening in Concord, North Carolina in August 2016. By that month, Clean Juice had signed its first 5 franchising agreements after launching its franchising platform earlier that summer.

Its first franchised location opened in Carrollwood, Florida in March 2017. By July of that year, there were 5 franchised locations in operation with another 58 in development. A total of 10 stores (two of them corporately-owned) were operational by September 2017. In 2018, the company began using the mobile payment and loyalty reward platform, LevelUp. That year, the company also surpassed 100 franchise units either in development or in operation in 16 states.

In its short history, Clean Juice has amassed dozens of achievements and awards, including  being named #154 in Entrepreneur Magazine's 2021 Franchise 500® ranking and the #1 spot as Franchise Gator's 2021 Fastest-Growing Franchises list.

Products

Clean Juice primarily sells fruit smoothies and juices (cold-pressed and fresh) with select food items like acai bowls, salads, toasts, sandwiches and wraps. All of their ingredients have been certified 100% organic by the United States Department of Agriculture.

References

External links
Official website

Restaurants established in 2014
Restaurant franchises